Paul Coppejans (28 September 1933 – August 2018) was a Belgian pole vaulter. He competed at the 1964 Olympics and finished in 27th place with a jump of 4.20 m. His personal best is 4.73 m (1966).

References

1933 births
2018 deaths
Athletes (track and field) at the 1964 Summer Olympics
Olympic athletes of Belgium
Belgian male pole vaulters